Nicks Creek is a  long 3rd order tributary to Little River in Moore County, North Carolina.

Variant names
According to the Geographic Names Information System, it has also been known historically as:  
Nick Creek

Course
Nicks Creek rises on the Little River and Jackson Creek divide about 0.5 miles east of West End in Moore County, North Carolina.  Nicks Creek then flows easterly to meet the Little River about 1 mile east of Whispering Pines.

Watershed
Nicks Creek drains  of area, receives about 49.3 in/year of precipitation, has a topographic wetness index of 437.66 and is about 46% forested.  Nicks Creek is classed as WS-III in terms of water quality.

External links
Nicks Creek Trail
Save our Sandhills
Nicks Creek Bridge
Birding on Nicks Creek Greenway

References

Rivers of North Carolina
Rivers of Moore County, North Carolina